Elizabeth Ray (born Betty Lou Ray on May 14, 1943, in Marshall, North Carolina) was the central figure in a much-publicized sex scandal in 1976 that ended the career of U.S. Rep. Wayne Hays (D-Ohio).

The Washington Post reported that Ray had been on the payroll of a committee run by Hays for two years as a clerk-secretary. During that time, she admitted, her actual job duties were providing Congressman Hays sexual favors: "I can't type, I can't file, I can't even answer the phone." Ray, who had won the title of Miss Virginia 1975 in a beauty contest, says she worked briefly as a stewardess, waitress and car rental clerk before beginning work on Capitol Hill in the summer of 1972. Ray also admitted having sex with married Sen. Mike Gravel (D-Alaska) at his houseboat in August 1972. According to Ray, the meeting was arranged by Rep. Kenneth J. Gray (D-Illinois), her boss at the time, in exchange for Gravel's support of a bill Gray was pushing. Both Gravel and Gray denied the accusations and a federal investigation ended with no charges being filed. Decades later, Gravel admitted having sex with Ray, but continued to maintain that it was not in exchange for his vote.

After the Hays scandal broke, a book appeared in her name, titled The Washington Fringe Benefit. She later posed for Playboy several times and tried acting and stand-up comedy. However, these efforts did not develop into a career and she faded into obscurity.

See also
Fanne Foxe
Rita Jenrette
Blaze Starr

References

1943 births
Living people
Employees of the United States House of Representatives
Mistresses
People from Marshall, North Carolina